Craig Andrew Foster AM (born 15 April 1969), nicknamed Fozzy or Fozz, is an Australian retired soccer player, human rights activist and sports analyst for the Stan Sport streaming service in Australia. Foster played soccer professionally from 1988 to 2003, including for the national team, the Socceroos, from 1996 to 2000, and was chief soccer analyst for SBS from around 2002 until June 2020. He was the 419th Socceroo, and the 40th captain of the national team.

He is increasingly known as a human rights advocate, and is a vocal critic of the Australian Government's treatment of asylum seekers. He earned a Bachelor of Laws degree in 2019. Foster was elected Chair of the Australian Republic Movement in November 2022.

Early years
Craig Andrew Foster was born in 1969 in  Lismore, New South Wales, later attending Kadina High School, periodically returning to speak and motivate students. Both sides of his family are of Anglo-Celtic descent.

Qualifications
 FFA Pro Coaching Licence
 Postgraduate Degree in Football Management, Masters in International Sport Management (around 2012), Johan Cruyff Institute
 Bachelor of Laws, CQUniversity Australia (2019)

Playing career

Club career
Playing as a midfielder, Foster debuted with Sydney Croatia in 1988, playing in a losing grand final in his first season. Foster has said his time at Sydney Croatia is what began his interest in multiculturalism.

He moved to Victorian club Sunshine George Cross in 1989 before returning to Sydney to play for Avala in the NSW Super League in 1992. In 1992/3, Foster played for Ernest Borel in Hong Kong, before returning to Australia to play for Adelaide City in 1994 and then Marconi in the NSL in 1996/7.

As a 28-year-old he moved to England, linking up with Terry Venables firstly at Portsmouth in 1997/98, before moving to Crystal Palace as a free agent from 1998 to 2000.

He returned to Australia to play with Northern Spirit, based in North Sydney, until his retirement from the game in 2003.

In 2013 he was listed as a player for the Belmore United Over 35s along with Paul Okon and Francis Awaritefe.

International career
Foster represented Australia at under-16 level, reaching the quarter finals at the 1985 FIFA U-16 World Championship in China.

He was the 419th player for the Australia national team (the Socceroos) from 1996 to 2000, earning 29 caps, and was the team's 40th captain, and scoring nine goals.

As a Socceroo, he played in the following competitions and games:
 FIFA Confederations Cup (runner-up: 1997)
 OFC Nations Cup (winner: 1996, 2000)
 As captain, friendly match, 1–1 draw with Bulgaria, 15 February 2000)
 Australia – Team of the Century: nominee

Football honours
 One of a team of 11 Hong Kong Top Footballers (an annual award) in the 1991-92 Hong Kong First Division League
 1997 Oceania Footballer of the Year: nominee (5th overall)
 2000 OFC Nations Cup: Top scorer

In retirement
 Foster still plays for Waverley Old Boys Over 35s.

Other roles related to soccer

Foster started his on-air career with the Seven Network, serving as a soccer analyst and principal commentator on their then pay TV sport channel, C7 Sport, as well as regularly appearing as a panellist on SBS' weekly soccer program On The Ball. He later joined SBS full-time, working with Les Murray and the Johnny Warren at the helm of SBS' hugely successful soccer broadcasts. He became known as "Fozz" or "Fozzy".

Following his retirement from professional soccer, Foster became the chief soccer analyst for the SBS show The World Game, from around 2002 until June 2020. He is remembered for his commentary during the World Cup Qualifier in November 2005 against Uruguay,  and during the 2006 FIFA World Cup, Foster was part of the SBS commentary team from Germany.

He advocated for a more Spanish/South American style of play, as opposed to the constant use of the long ball in soccer, and was also known for his outspoken stance on the need for soccer in Australia to mature.

In 2007, Foster was invited to be the Australian representative to judge the Ballon d'Or, the highest award given to an individual soccer player.

Also in 2007, he was a coach for the team assembled by the SBS television show Nerds FC in their second season.

In June 2020, it was announced that Foster would be leaving SBS, after working for 18 years as a sports presenter. He joined Stan Sport in August 2020, in time to co-present, along with UK presenter Max Rushden, several big UEFA competitions: the  Champions League the Europa League, and  the Conference League.

Foster has been a strong advocate for players' rights, having served for five years on Professional Footballers Australia (PFA) Executive, as a Director of the PFA's commercial wing, PFAM (PFA Management), and formerly as Interim Chief Executive of the Australian Soccer Players' Association (PFA's former name). He is a life member of the PFA, and in 2016 was appointed interim chairman of the PFA.

Other roles include being an Ambassador for the Johan Cruyff Institute (since 2018) and a co-director/ board member of John Moriarty Football.

Human rights and social advocacy

He has long been an advocate for footballers and has been human rights and refugee ambassador for Amnesty International. He has often used his position as presenter and chief football analyst at SBS to criticise unethical practices in the game. He works in a range of social programs, including Indigenous rights and self-determination; homelessness in Australia; climate change; and advocacy for refugees.

Hakeem al-Araibi campaign
Foster was vocal in campaigning on behalf of Bahraini footballer Hakeem al-Araibi, who was granted protection as a political refugee in Australia in 2014 but was detained upon arrival in Thailand in November 2018 while on his honeymoon with his wife owing to an Interpol red notice put out by Bahrain. Foster travelled to Switzerland to present a petition with more than 50,000 signatures demanding the release of the detained footballer and held talks with general secretary Fatma Samoura FIFA on 29 January 2019, spent time in Thailand speaking to al-Araibi's legal team and visited al-Araibi in prison. Foster's many tweets on the topic were widely shared. After al-Araibi's release was secured, others tweeted nominations for Foster as Australian of the Year or even prime minister. Many politicians, including prime minister Scott Morrison praised him for his efforts.

Foster said after the release of al-Araibi that the fight had just begun, and after the incident had shone light on the atrocities against athletes during and after the Bahraini uprising of 2011, what was needed is a full investigation into the matter by both FIFA and the IOC to ensure that justice is done for all athletes. He also implicitly offered criticism of Australia's current policies on refugees, saying "Australia needs to look at how we treat every human being that comes to these shores, irrespective of how they arrive... We are all equal, and should all be treated with equal dignity, care and respect.", and "Australia must do better than we have in recent years.".

Refugee advocacy
On 22 February 2019, Foster published an open letter to the Australian prime minister Scott Morrison and leader of the opposition, Bill Shorten, in The Sydney Morning Herald, in which, after thanking them for their assistance in helping to free al-Araibi, he addressed the issue of how Australia treats its asylum seekers. He said "I have waited until after Hakeem was safely home [from Thailand] to explain that one of the reasons it was so difficult to garner international support was because of our own treatment of refugees. This was a constant theme throughout discussions with international stakeholders" and "The policy of indefinite, offshore detention does not uphold our international obligations...". He said that he was urging others to uphold their human rights obligations in allowing al-Araibi to return to Australia, while "we are failing to uphold our own".

He became the face of Amnesty Australia's "Game Over" (#GameOver) campaign in late 2019, which has been supported by high-profile sportspeople such as Liz Ellis, Benny Elias, Paul Roos, Ian Chappell, Lisa Sthalekar, Paul Wade, Frank Farina, Alex Tobin, Craig Moore; musician Jimmy Barnes, actors Bryan Brown and Anthony La Paglia musicians and many others. Sally McManus, and many others. The campaign centres on the plight of asylum seekers kept in indefinite detention by the Australian Government, for many years after 2013 at detention centres on Manus Island, (PNG), and Nauru. In October 2020, as part of the campaign, Foster and NRL star Sonny Bill Williams presented a petition containing more than 65,000 signatures to federal parliament, which called upon the government to take up New Zealand's longstanding (since 2013) offer to resettle refugees who had been held Australian offshore detention for many years.

On 23 March 2022 Foster delivered the Australian National University's annual "Australia and the World Lecture", which had been postponed from 2021 owing to the COVID-19 pandemic in Australia, at the National Press Club of Australia. It was titled "Human Rights, Democracy and Global Citizenry - Recovering Australia's Humanity and Place in the World: 2021 ANU Australia and the World Lecture". The address looked at Australia's role in the world from the lived experience of asylum seekers and refugees, and argued that the nation should live up to its commitments as a responsible global citizen. In the talk, he said that Australia had not performed well Indigenous and refugee rights or on climate change. He bemoaned the lack of good leadership on these issues, and said that the colonisation of Australia had been underpinned by racism, and is still present in policy and media coverage; that it is a "festering sore on the national psyche". The following day, Home Affairs Minister Karen Andrews announced that the government would accept New Zealand's to resettle some of the refugees.

Other roles
Foster was formerly Director of the Council on Australia Latin America Relations with the Department of Foreign Affairs and Trade.

He has volunteered with Play for Lives (#PlayForLives), a response to the COVID-19 pandemic by sporting people and bodies, which began in Australia and expanded internationally.

He is a driving force behind "#RacismNotWelcome", a grassroots campaign initiated the Addison Road Community Centre,  supported by local government associations across Australia. Their strategy includes building street signs bearing the slogan "#RacismNotWelcome" in every local council in Australia.

 Foster also holds the following positions:
 Adjunct Professor of Sport & Social Responsibility with Torrens University
 Ambassador for The Big Issue Street Soccer Program
 Member of the Australia Committee of Human Rights Watch
 Director of the Nangala Foundation for early literacy in Indigenous communities and the Moriarty Foundation football programs
 Member of the Advisory Council of the Australian Human Rights Institute at UNSW
 Member of Affinity Intercultural Foundation
 Director of the Crescent Foundation
 Chair of the Australian Republican Movement

Recognition and honours

As a sports broadcaster with SBS, Foster won at least three Logie Awards for the Most Outstanding Sports Coverage as part of The World Game team at SBS. Australia's Round of 16 match against Italy in 2006 (at the 2007 Logies); and the 2018 World Cup in Russia (at the 2019 Logies). In 2015 Foster and Les Murray also accepted the Logie in 2015 for their coverage the 2014 World Cup by The World Game. (One source reports a win for the 2005 FIFA World Cup qualifier against Uruguay in Sydney, but this is not confirmed.)

In 2019, the Foster was recognised by the Australian Financial Review as a "True Australian Leader", while The Sydney Morning Herald listed him as one of the "People that Defined 2019".

In 2020 he was a finalist in the Australian Human Rights Commission's Human Rights Medal, for his work in advocating for Hakeem al-Araibi in 2019, and in the same year was awarded the NSW Humanitarian Award (awarded during Refugee Week each year by the NSW Service for the Treatment and Rehabilitation of Torture and Trauma Survivors) for his work with sport and human rights, and the Abyssinian Medal, as part of the 14th Australian Muslim Achievement Awards (AMAA)  founded and hosted by the Mission of Hope and led by Hanan Dover.

He was a finalist for NSW Australian of the Year in 2021.

Artist Julian Meagher decided that he would paint a portrait of Foster each year until it was shortlisted for the prestigious Archibald Prize. His first attempt in 2020 did not make it, but in 2021 his portrait, named Fozzy, made the shortlist.

In 2021, Foster was appointed a Member of the Order of Australia (AM) for significant service to multiculturalism, to human rights and refugee support organisations, and to football.

Addresses
 2019: Foster gave the opening address for the UN's Centre for Sport and Human Rights Conference in Geneva
 2019: Higginbotham Lecture for RMIT University in Melbourne
 March 2022: Australian National University's "Australia and the World Lecture" (postponed from 2021), at the National Press Club of Australia
 April 2022: UniSA Nelson Mandela Lecture, presented by the Hawke Centre at Adelaide Convention Centre (postponed from 2021) in Adelaide.

Publications
Foster is a former columnist for the Sun Herald, and writes for The Sydney Morning Herald, The Age, The Guardian, and other publications.

Monographs include:
 
  (Subtitled: How people power challenged two monarchies, a military junta and football's governing body FIFA... and won.)

Personal life
Foster is married to Lara Foster, and they have three children, Jake, Jemma, and Charli. He wrote a dedication to them in Fighting for Hakeem.

He says he is an introvert, who does not relish social situations.

References

External links

 
 
 

1969 births
Living people
Australian soccer players
Australian expatriate soccer players
Australia international soccer players
National Soccer League (Australia) players
Adelaide City FC players
Crystal Palace F.C. players
Marconi Stallions FC players
Northern Spirit FC players
People from Lismore, New South Wales
Portsmouth F.C. players
Sydney United 58 FC players
Australian television presenters
Australian soccer commentators
Caroline Springs George Cross FC players
Australian Institute of Sport soccer players
Singapore FA players
Association football midfielders
Members of the Order of Australia
Recipients of the Australian Sports Medal
Expatriate footballers in Malaysia
Australian expatriate sportspeople in Malaysia
1996 OFC Nations Cup players
1997 FIFA Confederations Cup players
2000 OFC Nations Cup players
Australian republicans
Sportsmen from New South Wales
Soccer players from New South Wales